A stadium (: stadiums or stadia) is a place or venue for (mostly) outdoor sports, concerts, or other events and consists of a field or stage either partly or completely surrounded by a tiered structure designed to allow spectators to stand or sit and view the event.

Pausanias noted that for about half a century the only event at the ancient Greek Olympic festival was the race that comprised one length of the stadion at Olympia, where the word "stadium" originated.

Most of the stadiums with a capacity of at least 10,000 are used for association football. Other popular stadium sports include gridiron football, baseball, cricket, the various codes of rugby, field lacrosse, bandy, and bullfighting. Many large sports venues are also used for concerts.

Etymology

"Stadium" is the Latin form of the Greek word "stadion" (στάδιον), a measure of length equalling the length of 600 human feet. As feet are of variable length the exact length of a stadion depends on the exact length adopted for 1 foot at a given place and time. Although in modern terms 1 stadion = , in a given historical context it may actually signify a length up to 15% larger or smaller.

The equivalent Roman measure, the stadium, had a similar length – about  – but instead of being defined in feet was defined using the Roman standard passus to be a distance of 125 passūs (double-paces).

The English use of stadium comes from the tiered infrastructure surrounding a Roman track of such length.

Most dictionaries provide for both stadiums and stadia as valid English plurals.

History

The oldest known stadium is the Stadium at Olympia in Greece, where the ancient Olympic Games were held from 776 BC. Initially the Games consisted of a single event, a sprint along the length of the stadium.

Greek and Roman stadiums have been found in numerous ancient cities, perhaps the most famous being the Stadium of Domitian, in Rome.

The excavated and refurbished ancient Panathenaic Stadium hosted attempted revivals of the Olympic Games in 1870 and 1875 before hosting the first modern Olympics in 1896, the 1906 Intercalated Games, and some events of the 2004 Summer Olympics. The excavation and refurbishment of the stadium was part of the legacy of the Greek national benefactor Evangelos Zappas, and it was the first ancient stadium to be used in modern times.

Modernity

The first stadiums to be built in the modern era were basic facilities, designed for the single purpose of fitting as many spectators in as possible. With tremendous growth in the popularity of organised sport in the late Victorian era, especially association football in the United Kingdom and baseball in the United States, the first such structures were built. One such early stadium was the Lansdowne Road Stadium, the brainchild of Henry Dunlop, who organised the first All Ireland Athletics Championships. Banned from locating sporting events at Trinity College, Dunlop built the stadium in 1872. "I laid down a cinder running path of a quarter-mile, laid down the present Lansdowne Tennis Club ground with my own theodolite, started a Lansdowne archery club, a Lansdowne cricket club, and last, but not least, the Lansdowne Rugby Football Club – colours red, black and yellow." Some 300 cartloads of soil from a trench beneath the railway were used to raise the ground, allowing Dunlop to use his engineering expertise to create a pitch envied around Ireland.

Other early stadiums from this period in the UK include the Stamford Bridge stadium (opened in 1877 for the London Athletic Club) and Anfield stadium (1884 as a venue for Everton F.C.).

In the U.S., many professional baseball teams built large stadiums mainly out of wood, with the first such venue being the South End Grounds in Boston, opened in 1871 for the team then known as the Boston Beaneaters (now the Atlanta Braves). Many of these parks caught fire, and those that did not proved inadequate for a growing game. All of the 19th-century wooden parks were replaced, some after a few years, and none survive today.

Goodison Park was the first purpose-built association football stadium in the world. Walton-based building firm Kelly brothers were instructed to erect two uncovered stands that could each accommodate 4,000 spectators. A third covered stand accommodating 3,000 spectators was also requested. Everton officials were impressed with the builder's workmanship and agreed two further contracts: exterior hoardings were constructed at a cost of £150 and 12 turnstiles were installed at a cost of £7 each. The stadium was officially opened on 24 August 1892 by Lord Kinnaird and Frederick Wall of the Football Association. No football was played; instead the 12,000 crowd watched a short track and field event followed by music and a fireworks display. Upon its completion the stadium was the first joint purpose-built football stadium in the world.

The architect Archibald Leitch brought his experience with the construction of industrial buildings to bear on the design of functional stadiums up and down the country. His work encompassed the first 40 years of the 20th century. One of his most notable designs was Old Trafford in Manchester. The ground was originally designed with a capacity of 100,000 spectators and featured seating in the south stand under cover, while the remaining three stands were left as terraces and uncovered. It was the first stadium to feature continuous seating along the contours of the stadium.

These early venues, originally designed to host football matches, were adopted for use by the Olympic Games, the first one being held in 1896 in Athens, Greece. The White City Stadium, built for the 1908 Summer Olympics in London is often cited as the first modern seater stadium, at least in the UK. Designed by the engineer J.J. Webster and completed in 10 months by George Wimpey, on the site of the Franco-British Exhibition, this stadium with a seating capacity of 68,000 was opened by King Edward VII on 27 April 1908. The infield included a swimming and diving pool. The London Highbury Stadium, built in 1913, was the first stadium in the UK to feature a two-tiered seating arrangement when it was redesigned in the Art Deco style in 1936.

During these decades, parallel stadium developments were taking place in the U.S. The Baker Bowl, a baseball park in Philadelphia that opened in its original form in 1887 but was completely rebuilt in 1895, broke new ground in stadium construction in two major ways. The stadium's second incarnation featured the world's first cantilevered second deck (tier) in a sports venue, and was the first baseball park to use steel and brick for the majority of its construction. Another influential venue was Boston's Harvard Stadium, built in 1903 by Harvard University for its American football team and track and field program. It was the world's first stadium to use concrete-and-steel construction. In 1909, concrete-and-steel construction came to baseball with the opening of Shibe Park in Philadelphia and, a few months later, Forbes Field in Pittsburgh. The latter was the world's first three-tiered sporting venue. The opening of these parks marked the start of the "jewel box" era of park construction. The largest stadium crowd ever was 199,854 people watching the final match of the 1950 World Cup at Rio de Janeiro's Maracanã on 16 July 1950.

Antiquity

Stadiums in ancient Greece and Rome were built for different purposes, and at first only the Greeks built structures called "stadium"; Romans built structures called "circus". Greek stadia were for foot races, whereas the Roman circus was for horse races. Both had similar shapes and bowl-like areas around them for spectators. The Greeks also developed the theatre, with its seating arrangements foreshadowing those of modern stadiums. The Romans copied the theatre, then expanded it to accommodate larger crowds and more elaborate settings. The Romans also developed the double-sized round theatre called amphitheatre, seating crowds in the tens of thousands for gladiatorial combats and beast shows. The Greek stadium and theatre and the Roman circus and amphitheatre are all ancestral to the modern stadium.

Examples

Types
Domed stadiums are distinguished from conventional stadiums by their enclosing roofs. Many of these are not actually domes in the pure architectural sense, some being better described as vaults, some having truss-supported roofs and others having more exotic designs such as a tensegrity structure. But, in the context of sports stadiums, the term "dome" has become standard for all covered stadiums, particularly because the first such enclosed stadium, the Houston Astrodome, was built with an actual dome-shaped roof. Some stadiums have partial roofs, and a few have even been designed to have moveable fields as part of the infrastructure. The Caesars Superdome in New Orleans is a true dome structure made of a lamellar multi-ringed frame and has a diameter of 680 feet (210 m). It is the largest fixed domed structure in the world.

Even though enclosed, dome stadiums are called stadiums because they are large enough for, and designed for, what are generally considered to be outdoor sports such as athletics, American football, association football, rugby, and baseball. Those designed for what are usually indoor sports like basketball, ice hockey and volleyball are generally called arenas. Exceptions include:

 Cameron Indoor Stadium, home to Duke University's Blue Devils men's and women's basketball programs.
 Red Bull Arena, an open-air venue that is home to Major League Soccer's New York Red Bulls and NJ/NY Gotham FC of the National Women's Soccer League.
 Paris La Défense Arena, a domed stadium that is home to the rugby union club Racing 92. It has a movable seating block that allows a configuration appropriate for indoor court sports.
 Chicago Stadium (demolished), former home to the National Hockey League's Chicago Blackhawks and the National Basketball Association's Chicago Bulls.

Design issues

Different sports require different playing surfaces of various size and shape. Some stadiums are designed primarily for a single sport while others can accommodate different events, particularly ones with retractable seating. Stadiums built specifically for association football are common in Europe; Gaelic games stadiums, such as Croke Park, are common in Ireland, while stadiums built specifically for baseball or American football are common in the United States. The most common multiple use design combines a football pitch with a running track, although certain compromises must be made. The major drawback is that the stands are necessarily set back a good distance from the pitch, especially at the ends of the pitch. In the case of some smaller stadiums, there are not stands at the ends. When there are stands all the way around, the stadium takes on an oval shape. When one end is open, the stadium has a horseshoe shape. All three configurations (open, oval and horseshoe) are common, especially in the case of American college football stadiums. Rectangular stadiums are more common in Europe, especially for football where many stadiums have four often distinct and very different stands on the four sides of the stadium. These are often all of different sizes and designs and have been erected at different periods in the stadium's history. The vastly differing character of European football stadiums has led to the growing hobby of ground hopping where spectators make a journey to visit the stadium for itself rather than for the event held there. In recent years the trend of building completely new oval stadiums in Europe has led to traditionalists criticising the designs as bland and lacking in the character of the old stadiums they replace.

In North America, where baseball and American football are the two most popular outdoor spectator sports, a number of football/baseball multi-use stadiums were built, especially during the 1960s, and some of them were successful.

Since the requirements for baseball and football are significantly different, the trend has been toward the construction of single-purpose stadiums, beginning with Kansas City in 1972–1973 and accelerating in the 1990s. In several cases, an American football stadium has been constructed adjacent to a baseball park, to allow for the sharing of mutual parking lots and other amenities. With the rise of MLS, the construction of soccer-specific stadiums has also increased since the late 1990s to better fit the needs of that sport. In many cases, earlier baseball stadiums were constructed to fit into a particular land area or city block. This resulted in asymmetrical dimensions for many baseball fields. Yankee Stadium, for example, was built on a triangular city block in The Bronx, New York City. This resulted in a large left field dimension but a small right field dimension.

Before more modern football stadiums were built in the United States, many baseball parks, including Fenway Park, the Polo Grounds, Wrigley Field, Comiskey Park, Tiger Stadium, Griffith Stadium, Milwaukee County Stadium, Shibe Park, Forbes Field, Yankee Stadium, and Sportsman's Park were used by the National Football League or the American Football League. (To a certain extent, this continues in lower football leagues as well, with the venue now known as Charles Schwab Field Omaha being used as the home stadium of the United Football League's Omaha Nighthawks.) Along with today's single use stadiums is the trend for retro-style ballparks closer to downtown areas. Oriole Park at Camden Yards was the first such ballpark for Major League Baseball to be built, using early-20th-century styling with 21st-century amenities.

There is a solar-powered stadium in Taiwan that produces as much energy as it needs to function.

Stadium designers often study acoustics to increase noise caused by fans' voices, aiming to create a lively atmosphere.

Lighting 

Until the advent of floodlights, most games played on large areas had to rely on natural lighting.

Bramall Lane was reportedly the first floodlit stadium. Floodlighting in association football dates as far back as 1878, when there were floodlit experimental matches at Bramall Lane, Sheffield during the dark winter afternoons. With no national grid, lights were powered by batteries and dynamoes, and were unreliable.

Since the development of electrical grids, lighting has been an important element in stadium design, allowing games to be played after sundown, and in covered, or partly covered stadiums that allow less natural light, but provide more shelter for the public.

Spectator areas and seating

An "all-seater" stadium has seats for all spectators. Other stadiums are designed so that all or some spectators stand to view the event. The term "all-seater" is not common in the U.S., as very few American stadiums have sizeable standing-only sections. Poor stadium design has contributed to disasters, such as the Hillsborough disaster and the Heysel Stadium disaster. Since these, all Premier League, UEFA European Championship and FIFA World Cup qualifying matches require all spectators to be seated.

Seating areas may be known as terraces, tiers, or decks. Originally set out for standing room only, they are now usually equipped with seating. Another term used in the US is bleachers, which is mostly used for seating areas with bench seats as opposed to individual seats, and which often are uncovered; the name refers to the bleaching effect direct, unshaded  sunlight has on the benches and patrons in those sections.

Many stadiums make luxury suites or boxes available to patrons at high prices. These suites can accommodate ten to thirty people, depending on the venue. Luxury suites at events such as the Super Bowl can cost hundreds of thousands of dollars.

Safety and security 

Due to the number of people congregating in stadiums and the frequency of events, many notable accidents have occurred in the past, some causing injury and death. For example, the Hillsborough disaster was a human crush at Hillsborough Stadium in Sheffield, England on 15 April 1989. The resulting 97 deaths and 765 injuries makes this the worst disaster in British sporting history.

Much effort has been spent to avoid the recurrence of such events, both in design and legislation. Especially where there is a perceived risk of terrorism or violence attention remains high to prevent human death and keep stadiums as places where families can enjoy a public event together.

In Europe and South America, during the twentieth century, it was common for violent bands of supporters to fight inside or close to association football stadiums. In the United Kingdom they are known as hooligans.

Structural features that increase safety include separate entry and exit accesses for each spectator area, especially separating accesses for home and visitor supporters, dividing walls, glass parapets, vibration attenuation and sprinkler systems.

Security features that have been adopted include armed surveillance, Identity document checks, video surveillance, metal detectors and security searches to enforce rules that forbid spectators to carry dangerous or potentially dangerous items.

Political and economic issues

Modern stadiums, especially the largest among them, are megaprojects that can only be afforded by the largest corporations, wealthiest individuals, or government. Sports fans have a deep emotional attachment to their teams. In North America, with its closed-league "franchise" system, there are fewer teams than cities which would like them. This creates tremendous bargaining power for the owners of teams, whereby owners can threaten to relocate teams to other cities unless governments subsidize the construction of new facilities. In Europe and Latin America, where there are multiple association football clubs in any given city, and several leagues in each country, no such monopoly power exists, and stadiums are built primarily with private money. Outside professional sports, governments are also involved through the intense competition for the right to host major sporting events, primarily the Summer Olympics and the FIFA World Cup (of association football), during which cities often pledge to build new stadiums in order to satisfy the International Olympic Committee (IOC) or FIFA.

Corporate naming

In recent decades, to help take the burden of the massive expense of building and maintaining a stadium, many American and European sports teams have sold the rights to the name of the facility. This trend, which began in the 1970s, but accelerated greatly in the 1990s, has led to sponsors' names being affixed to both established stadiums and new ones. In some cases, the corporate name replaces (with varying degrees of success) the name by which the venue has been known for many years. But many of the more recently built stadiums, like the Volkswagen Arena in Wolfsburg, Germany, have never been known by a non-corporate name. The sponsorship phenomenon has since spread worldwide. There remain a few municipally owned stadiums, which are often known by a name that is significant to their area (for example, Boston's Fenway Park). In recent years, some government-owned stadiums have also been subject to naming-rights agreements, with some or all of the revenue often going to the team(s) that play there.

One consequence of corporate naming has been an increase in stadium name changes, when the namesake corporation changes its name, or if it is the naming agreement simply expires. Phoenix's Chase Field, for example, was previously known as Bank One Ballpark, but was renamed to reflect the takeover of the latter corporation. San Francisco's historic Candlestick Park was renamed as 3Com Park for several years, but the name was dropped when the sponsorship agreement expired, and it was another two years before the new name of Monster Cable Products' Monster Park was applied. Local opposition to the corporate naming of that particular stadium led San Francisco's city council to permanently restore the Candlestick Park name once the Monster contract expired. More recently, in Ireland, there has been huge opposition to the renaming of Dublin's historic Lansdowne Road as the Aviva Stadium. Lansdowne was redeveloped as the Aviva, opening in May 2010.

On the other hand, Los Angeles' Great Western Forum, one of the earliest examples of corporate renaming, retained its name for many years, even after the namesake bank no longer existed, the corporate name being dropped only after the building later changed ownership. This practice has typically been less common in countries outside the United States. A notable exception is the Nippon Professional Baseball league of Japan, in which many of the teams are themselves named after their parent corporations. Also, many newer European football stadiums, such as the University of Bolton and Emirates Stadiums in England and Signal Iduna Park and Allianz Arena in Germany have been corporately named.

This new trend in corporate naming (or renaming) is distinguishable from names of some older venues, such as Crosley Field, Wrigley Field, and the first and second Busch Stadiums, in that the parks were named by and for the club's owner, which also happened to be the name of the company owned by those clubowners. (The current Busch Stadium received its name via a modern naming rights agreement.)

During the 2006 FIFA World Cup in Germany, some stadiums were temporarily renamed because FIFA prohibits sponsorship of stadiums. For example, the Allianz Arena in Munich was called the FIFA World Cup Stadium, Munich during the tournament. Likewise, the same stadium will be known as the "München Arena" during the European Competitions. Similar rules affect the Imtech Arena and Veltins-Arena. This rule applies even if the stadium sponsor is an official FIFA sponsor—the Johannesburg stadium then commercially known as "Coca-Cola Park", bearing the name of one of FIFA's major sponsors, was known by its historic name of Ellis Park Stadium during the 2010 FIFA World Cup. Corporate names are also temporarily replaced during the Olympics.

Environmental issues
Modern stadiums bring several negative environmental issues with their construction. They require thousands of tons of materials to build, they greatly increase traffic in the area around the stadium, as well as maintaining the stadium. The increased traffic around modern stadiums has led to create exposure zones says the Health Effect Institute, exposing 30-40% of people living around the stadium to potential health issues. Many stadiums are attempting to counteract these issues by implementing solar panels, and high efficiency lighting, to reduce their own carbon footprint.

Music venues

Although concerts, such as classical music, had been presented in them for decades, beginning in  the 1960s stadiums began to be used as live venues for popular music, giving rise to the term "stadium rock", particularly for forms of hard rock and progressive rock. The origins of stadium rock are sometimes dated to when The Beatles played Shea Stadium in New York in 1965. Also important was the use of large stadiums for American tours by bands in the later 1960s, such as The Rolling Stones, Grand Funk Railroad and Led Zeppelin. The tendency developed in the mid-1970s as the increased power of amplification and sound systems allowed the use of larger and larger venues. Smoke, fireworks and sophisticated lighting shows became staples of arena rock performances. Key acts from this era included Journey, REO Speedwagon, Boston, Foreigner, Styx, Kiss, Peter Frampton and Queen. In the 1980s arena rock became dominated by glam metal bands, following the lead of Aerosmith and including Mötley Crüe, Quiet Riot, W.A.S.P. and Ratt. Since the 1980s, rock, pop and folk stars, including the Grateful Dead, Madonna, Britney Spears, Beyoncé, and Taylor Swift, have undertaken large-scale stadium based concert tours.

See also

 Architectural structure
 List of nonbuilding structure types
 Amphitheatre
 Jumbotron
 Performing arts center
 Sport venue
 Sports complex
 Theater
 List of indoor arenas
 List of sports attendance figures
 Lists of stadiums

References

External links

 
 

 
 
Sports venues
Sports venues by type